Abeywardena is a Sinhalese surname. Notable people with the surname include:

Lakshman Yapa Abeywardena (born 1955), Sri Lankan politician
Mahinda Yapa Abeywardena (born 1945), Sri Lankan politician
Vajira Abeywardena (born 1960), Sri Lankan politician

Sinhalese surnames